The 2013 AdvoCare 500 was a NASCAR Sprint Cup Series stock car race held on November 10, 2013, at Phoenix International Raceway in Avondale, Arizona. Contested over 312 laps, it was the thirty-fifth as well as the ninth race in the Chase for the Sprint Cup during the 2013 NASCAR Sprint Cup Series season.  The race was won by Kevin Harvick for Richard Childress Racing, his 22nd career victory and final win in RCR's No. 29 as he moved to Stewart-Haas Racing in 2014. Kasey Kahne finished second, and Jimmie Johnson clinched third.

References

AdvoCare 500 (Phoenix)
AdvoCare 500 (Phoenix)
AdvoCare 500 (Phoenix)
NASCAR races at Phoenix Raceway